Io sono Tony Scott, ovvero come l'Italia fece fuori il più grande clarinettista del jazz is a 2012 Italian documentary directed by Franco Maresco.

It is a documentary film about the life of the Italian-American jazz musician Anthony Joseph Sciacca, known to the public as Tony Scott, starting from his childhood and youth in the USA, until his death, following a long illness, in Rome in 2007.

In the film, a great number of American and Italian musicians are interviewed, such as the legend of clarinet Buddy DeFranco, pianist Mario Rusca and drummer Tony Arco and, also, a few non-musician friends of Scott’s. Moreover, Scott’s three wives and the two daughters from his second marriage provided many details about Tony Scott's life and, also, about their own feelings.

The documentary was shown at the 63rd Locarno International Film Festival (as a non-competing film) and at the Vancouver International Film Festival in 2010.

Synopsis
Io sono Tony Scott, ovvero come l'Italia fece fuori il più grande clarinettista del jazz narrates in detail the private and artistic life of Tony Scott, who reportedly regarded himself as “the number one clarinetist in the world”. Through clips, pictures and interviews with people who knew Scott, this documentary film goes over the astonishing story of the life of Tony, who was a very popular clarinetist in the 1950s, but later encountered tremendous personal and professional decline, after relocating to Italy in the seventies.

In the first part of the documentary, in the USA, the facts about Scott’s artistic cooperation and strong friendship with Charlie "Bird" Parker and Billie Holiday are told, emphasizing his extraordinary talent as an experimenter and a virtuoso of jazz clarinet. In her interview, Tony’s first wife, Fran Attaway, reveals a hitherto unknown detail of his biography: according to her, during a trip to Indonesia, Tony was mistaken to be a spy and, consequently, detained and possibly tortured. Later in the film, it is suggested that this experience haunted him for the rest of his life and, perhaps, was the cause for the paranoid attitude he showed at times.

In the second part, which is set after his move to Europe, Tony’s personal decline and the waning of his success is narrated with strong sympathy and in great detail. In the film, it is suggested that such decline was caused both by the lack of recognition by the Italian public and music critics for his talent and by his difficult personality and erratic behaviour, which alienated Tony Scott from the circle of jazz musicians. Towards the end of his life, Tony lived in considerable poverty; he died in 2007, after a long illness. His body was temporarily placed in a relative’s family vault in Salemi (Sicily), where his father was born.

Production
Director Franco Maresco wrote that "To go over Tony's private and professional life is to go over sixty years of jazz, of unbelievable personal and artistic encounters. At the same time, it is a narration of the American history of the second half of the past century, of the battles for civil and human rights, of which Tony Scott was one of the main and most passionate supporters".

Cast
 Tony Scott as himself

References

External links

 Official website of Io sono Tony Scott, ovvero come l'Italia fece fuori il più grande clarinettista del jazz
 
Reviews 
 Film review by Jorge Mourinha
 Film review by Annibale Bezzan (in Italian)
 Film review by Nicoletta Dose (in Italian)
 Film review by Giona A. Nazzaro (in Italian)

2010 films
2010s Italian-language films
2010 documentary films
Italian documentary films